The Stoyan Bachvarov Dramatic Theatre (Dramatichen teatar ”Stoyan Bachvarov”) is a theatre in Varna, Bulgaria, founded in 1921 as the Municipal Professional Theatre. It occupies a historic building in the centre of the city designed by Nikola Lazarov and built between 26 March 1912 and 5 June 1932. The building was finished by the architects Dabko Dabkov and Jelyazko Bogdanov. It is named after the prominent theatre actor Stoyan Bachvarov. 

The theatre has a main auditorium, a branch stage and a small auditorium.

External links
 Official website

Buildings and structures in Varna, Bulgaria
Culture in Varna, Bulgaria
Theatres in Bulgaria
Tourist attractions in Varna, Bulgaria